The F.G. "Teddy" Oke Trophy is awarded to the regular season champion of the American Hockey League's North Division. It is the oldest trophy awarded by the AHL, but it passed through two leagues previously. It is one of the oldest trophies in professional hockey. It is named after Teddy Oke, one of the founders of the Canadian Professional Hockey League (CPHL) in 1926, who presented it to the inaugural CPHL championthe London Panthers.

The 1928–29 CPHL champions, the Windsor Bulldogs, took the trophy with them when they defected to the International Hockey League (IHL) in 1929–30. The Oke Trophy remained the championship trophy of the IHL until 1936, when the league played an interlocking schedule with the Can-Am League, maintaining the two leagues while forming the umbrella of the International-American Hockey League (I-AHL), the precursor of the AHL.

The I-AHL operated as this "circuit of mutual convenience" for the IHL and Can-Am for its first two years, with the IHL's four surviving teams comprising the I-AHL's West Division. They continued the trophy's tradition in the new league when it was awarded to the West Division champions, the Syracuse Stars.  The Stars went on to become the I-AHL's first champions by winning the Calder Cup.

The Oke Trophy remained the West Division championship through to the 1951–52 season. In the 1952–53 season, the AHL lost two teams, bringing an end to East and West divisions, making the Oke the trophy for the AHL team with the best regular-season record for a stretch of nine seasons (note that this would happen again in 1976–77, when the AHL contracted for a single season). When the AHL again expanded to East and West divisions in the 1961–62 season, the 1960–61 Oke Trophy champions, the Springfield Indians, took the trophy with them to the East Division, while a newly created John D. Chick Trophy became the West Division's trophy that same year. The AHL has realigned divisions several times since 1961–62, with the Oke Trophy following the previous winning team to the new division; this ended in the 2011–12 season, when the AHL expanded to six divisions and the Oke moved to a newly created division despite the 2010–11 winner not moving. This was repeated in the 2015–16 season, when the Oke did not follow the 2014–15 winner when the divisions contracted to four.

Canadian Professional Hockey League champions (1927–1929)

International Hockey League champions (1930–1936)

American Hockey League (since 1937)

Key
‡ = Eventual Calder Cup champions

External links
Official AHL website
AHL Hall of Fame Trophies
Historic standings and statistics - at Internet Hockey Database
Canadian Professional Hockey League

American Hockey League trophies and awards